Alexander David Hurtado Espinosa (born 21 April 1999) is an Ecuadorian racewalking athlete. He represented Ecuador at the 2020 Summer Olympics in the men's 20 kilometres walk.

Early life
Hurtado began racewalking at age 12 at school in Pichincha, Ecuador when his teacher introduced him to the sport. He was also inspired after watching Ecuadorian Olympic medal-winning racewalker Jefferson Pérez at the 2008 Summer Olympics.

Career
At the 2017 Ecuadorian Race Walking Championships, Hurtado set the South American under-20 and under-23 record for the 10 kilometres race walk with a time of 39:41.

Hurtado represented Ecuador at the 2018 IAAF World U20 Championships in the 10,000 metres walk and won a silver medal. He finished six thousandths of a second behind gold medal winner Yao Zhang.

Hurtado represented Ecuador at the 2019 South American Championships in the 20,000 meters walk and won a silver medal.

He represented Ecuador at the 2020 Summer Olympics in the men's 20 kilometres walk and finished in 19th place.

References

1999 births
Living people
Ecuadorian male racewalkers
Athletes (track and field) at the 2020 Summer Olympics
Olympic athletes of Ecuador
Sportspeople from Quito
21st-century Ecuadorian people